Abu Bakr Lawik was a ruler of Ghazna (in modern Afghanistan) from the Lawik dynasty. He was most likely a vassal of the Samanid Empire. In 962, the Turkic slave commander Alp-Tegin captured Ghazna after besieging the Citadel of Ghazni for four months. However, a few years later, Lawik managed to re-capture the town from Abu Ishaq Ibrahim, the son and successor of Alp-Tegin. This was not to last long; Abu Ishaq Ibrahim shortly returned to the town with Samanid aid, and took control of the town once again. Abu Bakr Lawik is thereafter no longer mentioned; he died before 977, the year that Ghaznavid control was established in Ghazna.

Sources
 
 
 
 

10th-century births
10th-century deaths
10th-century rulers in Asia